Proposta per les Illes (Catalan for "Proposal for the Islands"), or simply El Pi (pi means pine in Catalan) is a liberal Balearic autonomist political party, formed in November 2012 from the merger of several nationalist and regionalist parties: Convergència per les Illes (the successor of the Majorcan Union), the Lliga Regionalista de les Illes Balears, the Menorcan Union and Es Nou Partit. The party's two main leaders are Jaume Font (former leader of the Lliga Regionalista) and Josep Melià (former leader of Convergència). As the merger of parties from Mallorca, Menorca and Ibiza, el PI has elected representatives on each of these three islands, including 6 mayors and 82 councillors in 34 municipalities.

Ideology
El Pi claims to seek political dialogue and moderation, rejecting what it considers dogmatism and political posturing, while defining its own values as centrist and autonomist. While defending the Spanish Constitution and the Balearic Islands' Statute of Autonomy, the party also aims to promote the language, culture and traditions of the islands as well as its natural resources. El Pi defines itself as "socially and politically a big tent, balearista political formation with a tendency to centrism". While accepting the need to eventually reduce the deficits in public spending, el Pi has issued a statement critical of the Balearic government's announced intention to raise new taxes. The party's regionalist and nationalist roots, and its continued emphasis on promoting Balearic autonomy and the Catalan language as the "unforsakeable badge of identity of our community", place it within the ambit of moderate Catalan nationalism in the Balearic Islands.

Electoral performance

Parliament of the Balearic Islands

Cortes Generales

Balearic Islands

In the 2019 European Parliament election in Spain, PI joined the Coalition for a Solidary Europe electoral list (El Pi-Proposta per les Illes Balears-Coalición por una Europa Solidaria, CEUS) with other regionalist parties.
María del Mar Llaneras Pascual was the top PI representative in the list, in the 5th position.

Symbols

References

External links 
 Proposta per les Illes

Political parties in the Balearic Islands
Political parties in Ibiza
Liberal parties in Spain
Regionalist parties in Spain
Centrist parties in Spain
Political parties established in 2012
2012 establishments in Spain